Chill of an Early Fall is the eleventh studio album by American country music singer George Strait.  It was released by MCA Records. The album produced the singles "If I Know Me" and "You Know Me Better Than That", both of which reached Number One on the Billboard Hot Country Singles & Tracks (now Hot Country Songs) charts in 1991. Also released from this album were the title track (#3 on the country charts) and a cover of Hank Williams' "Lovesick Blues" (#24), Strait's first single since "Down and Out" in 1981 to miss Top Ten.

"Her Only Bad Habit Is Me" was recorded by Ty England on his 1995 self-titled debut.

Track listing

Personnel 
Joe Chemay – bass guitar
Floyd Domino – piano
Paul Franklin – steel guitar
Steve Gibson – acoustic guitar
Johnny Gimble – fiddle
Jim Horn – saxophone
Larrie Londin – drums
Liana Manis – background vocals
Brent Rowan – electric guitar
George Strait – lead vocals
Curtis Young – background vocals

The Ace in the Hole Band
On "Home in San Antone", "Lovesick Blues" and "Milk Cow Blues"
David Anthony – acoustic guitar
Mike Daily – steel guitar
Gene Elders – fiddle
Phil Fisher – drums
Terry Hale – bass guitar
Ronnie Huckaby – piano
Benny McArthur – electric guitar
Rick McRae – electric guitar

Charts

Weekly charts

Year-end charts

References

1991 albums
George Strait albums
MCA Records albums
Albums produced by Jimmy Bowen